Chip of the Flying U is a 1926 American silent Western comedy film based on a novel by Bertha Muzzy Sinclair. It was directed by Lynn Reynolds and starred Hoot Gibson. Universal Pictures produced and released the film.

A print is preserved at the UCLA Film and Television Archive.

Cast
 Hoot Gibson as Chip Bennett
 Virginia Brown Faire as Dr. Della Whitmore
 Philo McCullough as Duncan Whittaker
 Nora Cecil as Dr. Cecil Grantham
 DeWitt Jennings as J. G. Whitmore
 Harry Todd as Weary
 Pee Wee Holmes as Shorty
 Mark Hamilton as Slim
 Willie Fung as Chinese Cook
 Steve Clements as Indian

References

External links

 
 
 Poster

1926 films
Films directed by Lynn Reynolds
Universal Pictures films
Films based on American novels
1920s English-language films
1920s Western (genre) comedy films
American black-and-white films
1926 comedy films
Silent American Western (genre) comedy films
1920s American films